Dushi Fangyu Jiyao is an important Chinese book written by Qing dynasty geographer  (1631–1692 or 1624–1680), between 1630 and 1660.

The book covers aspects of natural, historical, and administrative geography, focusing especially on topography as it affects military strategy. It is notable for listing the names of 30,000 places.

References

External links
Full text at Wikisource

Qing dynasty literature
Chinese-language books
17th-century books
Geography books